Omoregie Ogbeide-Ihama is a Nigerian politician and engineer representing Oredo Federal Constituency at the Federal House of Representatives.

Early life and education 
Ogbeide-Ihama started his education at Emotan nursery and primary schools in Benin City, Edo State. He then enrolled in the Federal Government College Warri (Unity School) in Warri, where he graduated in 1993 with a senior school diploma. He continued on to the Univerniversity of Benin, where he studied and earned a Bachelor of Science in Civil Engineering in 1999 with Second Class Honors (Upper Division). He graduated in 2009 with an MBA in Oil and Gas Management from Robert Gordon University in Aberdeen, Scotland.

Career 
In 2015, Ogbeide-Ihama was elected to represent Oredo Federal Constituency in the Federal House of Representatives on the People's Democratic Party (PDP) platform. In 2019, he was re-elected member of House of Representatives till 2023. 

In 2022, he won the senatorial ticket for Edo South Federal Constituency.

References 

People from Edo State
Edo State politicians

1974 births
Living people